Manuella Vincter is a professor in the Department of Physics at Carleton University. 
She is the deputy spokesperson for the ATLAS experiment, and a Fellow of the Royal Society of Canada.

Career 
Vincter earned her B.Sc. in 1990 from McGill University, her M.Sc. in 1993 and her PhD in 1996, both at the University of Victoria. Her PhD thesis was on the precision measurement of the ratio of vector to axial-vector coupling of the weak force, which she conducted at the LEP collider at CERN as a member of the OPAL Experiment. She then joined the faculty at the University of Alberta, where she worked on the HERMES experiment at the DESY laboratory and also joined the ATLAS collaboration. She then joined Carleton University as a Canada Research Chair in Experimental Particle Physics, and was appointed Deputy Spokesperson for the ATLAS-Canada team. She was elected to the Royal Society of Canada in 2018, and in 2019 she was appointed Deputy Spokesperson for the ATLAS collaboration.

Research area 
Vincter's research is in experimental particle physics, with a focus on identifying and reconstructing the path of electrons in the ATLAS experiment. This allows for precise measurement of the electroweak interactions through the decay of W and Z bosons into electrons. She has also done research on the strong force and the structure of nucleons.

References

External links 

Manuella Vincter publications indexed by INSPIRE-HEP

Canadian women physicists
Canadian women scientists
University of Victoria alumni
Academic staff of the University of Alberta
Academic staff of Carleton University
Particle physicists
Large Hadron Collider
Year of birth missing (living people)
Living people